Kristoffer Lo (born 19 February 1985 in Moss, Norway) is a Norwegian jazz musician (tuba, flugabone, guitar, keyboards) and composer.

Biography 

Lo has redefined the use of tuba and its role in band. From its traditional role as the low-end in symphony orchestras and Dixieland bands, he has taken the instrument to a new direction, filling the position as the ultra low end in metal- and noise bands. With a bunch of electronics and huge amps, Kristoffer’s tuba sounds like a low-end monster and a high pitched squeal at the same time. He is a part of bands like Pelbo, Trondheim Jazz Orchestra, Microtub, Sunswitch and Highasakite.

With music studies from the jazz program at the Musikkonservatoriet i Trondheim, he has slowly built up a solid reputation both in Norway and elsewhere.

Honors 
2013: This years Jazzstipendiat at Moldejazz

Discography

Solo albums 
2013: Anomie (Gigafon Records)
2016: The Black Meat (Propeller Recordings)

Collaborations 
Midtnorsk Ungdomsstorband with André Roligheten and Brother K
2009: Live At Dokkhuset (MNJ Records)

With PELbO
2010: PELbO (Riot Factory)
2011: Days Of Transcendence (Riot Factory)

With Microtub (Hayward / Lo / Taxt)
2011: Microtub (Sofa Records)
2014: Star System (Sofa Records)

With Machina
2011: So Much For Dancing (Øra Fonogram)

With Sunswitch
2012: Sunswitch (Riot Factory)

With Highasakite
2012: All That Floats Will Rain (Propeller Records)
2014: Silent Treatment (Propeller Records)

With Yodok
2013: #2 (The Perfect Hoax)

With Yodok III
2014: Yodok III (A New Wave Of Jazz)
2015: The Sky Flashes. The Great Sea Yearns. (A New Wave Of Jazz)

With Trondheim Jazz Orchestra
2015: Savages (MNJ Records) feat. Kristoffer Lo

With Motorpsycho
2018: Roadwork Vol. 5 – Field Notes: The Fantastic Expedition of Järmyr, Ryan, Sæther & Lo - Live in Europe 2017 (Rune Grammofon) (Stickman Records)

References

External links 

21st-century Norwegian tubists
Norwegian jazz tubists
Norwegian jazz composers
Male jazz composers
Propeller Recordings artists
Norwegian University of Science and Technology alumni
Musicians from Trondheim
Musicians from Moss, Norway
1985 births
Living people
21st-century Norwegian male musicians
PELbO members